Global Catastrophic Risks is a 2008 non-fiction book edited by philosopher Nick Bostrom and astronomer Milan M. Ćirković. The book is a collection of essays from 26 academics written about various global catastrophic and existential risks,

Content 
The risks covered by the book include both anthropogenic (man made) risks and non-anthropogenic risks.

 Anthropogenic: artificial general intelligence, biological warfare, nuclear warfare, nanotechnology, anthropogenic climate change, global warming, stable global totalitarianism
 Non-anthropogenic: asteroid impacts, gamma-ray bursts

The book also addresses overarching issues such as policy responses and methods for predicting and managing catastrophes.

See also 

 The Precipice: Existential Risk and the Future of Humanity (book)
 Our Final Hour (book)

References

2008 non-fiction books
Books about existential risk
Futurology books
Works by Nick Bostrom